The Lokoya are an ethnic group who broke out from the Otuho nation numbering about 30,000 people living in between Jubek State and Eastern Equatoria state, South Sudan.

References

Ethnic groups in South Sudan